The canton of Vignobles et Bastides is an administrative division of the Tarn department, southern France. It was created at the French canton reorganisation which came into effect in March 2015. Its seat is in Rabastens.

It consists of the following communes:
 
Alos
Andillac
Beauvais-sur-Tescou
Cahuzac-sur-Vère
Campagnac
Castelnau-de-Montmiral
Grazac
Larroque
Lisle-sur-Tarn
Mézens
Montdurausse
Montels
Montgaillard
Montvalen
Puycelsi
Rabastens
Roquemaure
Saint-Beauzile
Sainte-Cécile-du-Cayrou
Saint-Urcisse
Salvagnac
La Sauzière-Saint-Jean
Tauriac
Le Verdier
Vieux

References

Cantons of Tarn (department)